Building Giants may refer to:

 Building Giants (TV series)
 Building Giants (magazine)